Linet Toroitich Chebet (born 4 November 1992) is a Ugandan long-distance runner. She competed in the women's marathon at the 2019 World Athletics Championships held in Doha, Qatar. She did not finish her race.

In 2013, she competed in the senior women's race at the 2013 IAAF World Cross Country Championships held in Bydgoszcz, Poland. She finished in 74th place.

In 2014, she represented Uganda at the 2014 Commonwealth Games held in Glasgow, Scotland in the women's 10,000 metres event. She finished in 6th place out of 13 competitors.

In 2019, she competed in the women's half marathon at the 2019 African Games held in Rabat, Morocco. She finished in 9th place.

References

External links 
 

Living people
1992 births
Place of birth missing (living people)
Ugandan female cross country runners
Ugandan female long-distance runners
Ugandan female marathon runners
World Athletics Championships athletes for Uganda
Athletes (track and field) at the 2014 Commonwealth Games
Commonwealth Games competitors for Uganda
African Games competitors for Uganda
Athletes (track and field) at the 2019 African Games
20th-century Ugandan women
21st-century Ugandan women